Papua Besena (lit. Papua Tribe) was a political party in Papua New Guinea.

History
The party was established in June 1973 by independent MP Josephine Abaijah. The party advocated a separate state of Papua and opposed immigration from New Guinea.

In the 1974 Port Moresby City Council elections the party won a landslide victory, and on 16 March 1975 Abaijah declared an independent Papuan state. However, this was ignored by the government. In the 1977 general elections the party won six seats, winning all constituencies in Port Moresby and Central Province. When provincial elections were held in 1979, it was victorious in Central Province.

In 1980 the party joined a government coalition headed by Prime Minister Julius Chan, alongside the Melanesian Alliance Party, the National Party, the People's Progress Party and some members of the United Party.

The party was reduced to three seats in the 1982 general elections, after which it returned to opposition. It lost all three seats in the 1987 elections, in which it received less than 1% of the vote. It did not contest any further national elections.

References

1973 establishments in Papua New Guinea
Anti-immigration politics in Oceania
Defunct political parties in Papua New Guinea
Political parties established in 1973
Political parties with year of disestablishment missing